George Stirling may refer to:
 George Faulds Stirling, English-born educator, rancher and political figure in British Columbia
 Sir George Stirling, 9th Baronet, Scottish British Army officer